The red lizardfish (Synodus ulae) is a species of lizardfish that lives mainly in the western Pacific Ocean.

References
 

red lizardfish
Fish of the Pacific Ocean
red lizardfish